Ulf Ivar Erik "Uffe" Sterner (born 11 February 1941) is a Swedish former professional ice hockey forward. He played in nine IIHF World Championships for Sweden, where the team won seven medals: one gold, five silver, and one bronze. He was also a member of the silver medal team at the 1964 Winter Olympics. Sterner played for Forshaga IF from 1956–61, Västra Frölunda IF from 1961–64, and for the New York Rangers in 1964–65, before returning to Sweden to play for Rögle BK and Färjestads BK. He finished his career in England with the London Lions in 1973–74. On 27 January 1965, he became the first European-trained player to play in the National Hockey League (NHL).

Playing career
Sterner made his hockey debut at 15 when he was accepted onto a second division club where he made a name for himself with his speed and scoring ability. On 12 November 1959, he made his international debut with Tre Kronor in a friendly match against Czechoslovakia's team. He scored his first goal in that game, which Tre Kronor won 11–3. He was the team's youngest player of all time. Through the late 1950s and early 1960s, he was one of Sweden's most popular players. He is also credited with inventing the "stick to skate to stick" maneuver. At the 1962 World Ice Hockey Championships, Sterner scored what he described as his most memorable goal when he scored the 3–0 goal against Team Canada. His team won the game 5–3 and took the gold medal. At the 1963 World Championship, he scored a hat trick against Canada in a 4–1 win. After the game, he and teammate Sven "Tumba" Johansson met King Gustaf VI Adolf and received a royal congratulations.

His first Olympics came in 1960 in Squaw Valley. The team did not earn a medal, but from that point on he was a dominating centre in international play. By 1963, the New York Rangers had taken interest, and in October, Sterner made the trip for training camp. The parties signed a five-game tryout agreement, but Sterner declined to play that season in order to conserve his amateur status for the 1964 Winter Olympics. The Swedish Olympic hockey team won a silver medal, and Sterner then attended the NY Rangers training camp in 1964 where he displayed excellent skills. However, the NHL, unlike the International Ice Hockey Federation (IIHF), permitted hitting and physical play on any point of the ice; international players were not allowed to hit in the offensive zone. Allowing him time to adjust to the North American game, the Rangers offered him a start with the St. Paul Rangers of the Central League, which he accepted. After two months, he had adapted to the different style of play and was promoted to the Baltimore Clippers of the American Hockey League. Finally, on 27 January 1965, he joined the Rangers in a game against the Boston Bruins, becoming the first European to play in the NHL.

Ultimately, Sterner played only four games in the NHL, and he did not register a point although Rangers coach Red Sullivan praised Sterner for his puckhandling skills. But he had been reluctant to play physically or to instigate physical play. He was sent back down to the AHL, and it soon became clear that he was not willing to return to the NHL for the 1965-66 season although he had signed a two year contract. As much as his skills carried him through games in the AHL, he simply did not have the training to play 60-minute games with full contact. In 1969, the IIHF adopted the same body-checking rules as the NHL, and four years later, Börje Salming joined the Toronto Maple Leafs, ending up playing 17 years in the NHL. Eight years after leaving the Rangers, Sterner and the Swedish national team finally faced the best Canadian NHL players in two exhibition games in Stockholm that were part of Team Canada's preparation for the Summit Series against the USSR. On September 16 1972, Sterner scored against Canada as the Swedes only narrowly lost the game. He was offered a contract by the Chicago Cougars of the rival World Hockey Association but declined the offer.

Personal life 
Sterner, his wife Pia, and their family currently live on a farm near Karlstad, where they keep four horses. He nicknames his horses after former teammates and friends; when one of the horses smashed his nose, he nicknamed it Alexander Ragulin.

Statistics

Regular season and playoffs

International

Coaching

Awards
Won the Golden Puck as Sweden's Player of the Year in 1962–63.
Named the best forward at the IIHF World Championships in 1969.
Inducted into the IIHF Hall of Fame in 2001.
WEC-A All-Star Team (1962, 1969).

References

External links

1941 births
Baltimore Clippers players
Färjestad BK players
Frölunda HC players
Ice hockey players at the 1960 Winter Olympics
Ice hockey players at the 1964 Winter Olympics
Ice hockey players with retired numbers
IIHF Hall of Fame inductees
Living people
London Lions (ice hockey) players
Medalists at the 1964 Winter Olympics
New York Rangers players
Olympic ice hockey players of Sweden
Olympic medalists in ice hockey
Olympic silver medalists for Sweden
People from Forshaga Municipality
Rögle BK players
St. Paul Rangers players
Swedish expatriate sportspeople in the United Kingdom
Swedish expatriate ice hockey players in the United States
Swedish ice hockey left wingers
Forshaga IF players
Sportspeople from Värmland County